"Mansize Rooster" is a song by Supergrass, released as the second single from their debut album I Should Coco. It reached number 20 in the UK Singles Chart, remaining on the chart for three weeks. Like its predecessor "Caught by the Fuzz", "Mansize Rooster" was originally limited to 500 copies as a 7-inch vinyl-only, Backbeat Records release, although pressings are believed to have been made since. The B-side remained to be "Sitting Up Straight", but the songs sound slightly different and have different runtimes to their present-day versions. The Backbeat vinyl it was primarily issued on was also green. The song is used in the movie Casper: A Spirited Beginning and is included in its soundtrack.

It was played as Supergrass' first ever live television performance on The Word in 1995.

Formats and Track listings

CD CDR6402
 "Mansize Rooster" (2:36)
 "Sitting Up Straight" (2:19)
 "Odd?" (4:10) Members of the band can be heard blowing bubbles into a bucket during the outro of this song.

7" RS6402 / LTD. ED. Red 7" R6402 / TC TCR6402
 "Mansize Rooster" (2:36)
 "Sitting Up Straight" (2:19)

5" / CD (In France only)
 "Mansize Rooster" (2:34)

Single Artwork
Designer: Designers Republic
Photography: Ed Coombes

The cover design is a lavish symmetrical pattern, which is slightly cartoon-like. It was commissioned, as the previous ("Caught by the Fuzz") single's artwork was, by the Designers Republic. Ed Coombes, who was responsible for the photography, is in fact another member of the Coombes family.

The French version features the band playing Twister on the cover.

Music video
Director: Dom and Nic
The video (which was filmed on a low-budget) begins with various shots of Gaz Coombes' eyes, ears/sideburns and mouth, then all three of the band are shown with Gaz in the foreground whilst Danny Goffey and Mick Quinn shake their heads wildly behind him. A bathtub in a completely black room is then seen, with the leaves of a potted fern dangling over it; a plug is dropped into the bathtub as it begins to fill up with dyed blue water. Yellow rubber ducks are also later seen in the water. Scenes of the band in an entirely white room playing their instruments, dancing crazily, jumping around in front of a mirror and holding up screens of each other are shown.

By this point all three members of Supergrass are sitting together in the bathtub naked, flicking each other with water and pulling faces. Later on the bathtub lurches forward and speeds off with the band still inside, holding onto the taps for support. At one stage there is use of a clapperboard. During one of the final choruses, Mick and Danny lift a screen up in front of Gaz and he 'transforms' into a woman (in drag with a white-blonde wig, lipstick, a beauty spot and false breasts). The video ends with the band walking in an odd fashion off into the distance as the picture fades out. Throughout the video there is also the occasional use of strobe lighting.

Gaz Coombes uses his red Gibson SG guitar during filming.

References

Supergrass songs
1995 singles
Parlophone singles